Schinia carolinensis is a moth of the family Noctuidae first described by William Barnes and James Halliday McDunnough in 1911. It is found in the United States from eastern North Carolina to the Florida peninsula and probably along the Gulf Coast.

Adults are on wing in late summer.

External links

Species report

Schinia
Moths of North America
Moths described in 1911